The Danish Sea Rescue Society (DSRS) (in Danish: Dansk Søredningsselskab) is a voluntary organization that assists sailors in Danish waters in non-life threatening situations and can be called in by the Danish authorities for Search and Rescue (SAR) operations.

Founded in 2004 as a charitable non-governmental organization its self-prescribed mission is to alleviate critical situations at sea by providing "pro-active sea rescue" (in Danish forebyggende søredning). Thereby it relies on donations and membership fees for financing. DSRS operates mainly in the Danish Straits, with stations in Årøsund, Bregnør, Copenhagen, Helsingør, Juelsminde, Kerteminde, Køge, Lynæs, Løgstør, Rudkøbing and Vordingborg. It is a full member of the International Maritime Rescue Federation (IMRF).

In 2019 the Danish Sea Rescue Society carried out 599 operations, all of them in coordination with or directly requested by the Danish Joint Rescue Coordination Center (JRCC Danmark) in Aarhus. The operations range from the towing of stranded or otherwise disabled vessels to searching for missing persons.

See also
 German Maritime Search and Rescue Service – German equivalent
 Norwegian Society for Sea Rescue – Norwegian equivalent
 Royal National Lifeboat Institute – British equivalent
 Royal Netherlands Sea Rescue Institution – Dutch equivalent
 Société Nationale de Sauvetage en Mer – French equivalent
 Swedish Sea Rescue Society – Swedish equivalent

References

External links 

 Official Website  (in Danish)

Sea rescue organizations
Charities based in Denmark
Organizations established in 2004
2004 establishments in Denmark